Stage is a 1951 Bollywood film starring Dev Anand and Ramola Devi in lead roles.

Music
"Dil Leke Dil Diya Hai, Ehsaan Kya Kiya Hai" - Mohammed Rafi, Lata Mangeshkar
"Kisi Se Pyar Karna Zindagi Barbaad Karna Hai" - Lata Mangeshkar
"Sach Kahan Hai Kisine Bach Ke Chalna" - Lata Mangeshkar, Sonik
"O Jaanewale, Dil Mein Teri Yaad Reh Gayi" - Geeta Dutt
"Jagmagaati Diwali Ki Raat Aa Gayi (Part-1)" - Asha Bhosle
"Jagmagaati Diwali Ki Raat Aa Gayi (Part-2)" - Asha Bhosle
"Dil Machalne Laga Jaag Uthi Dhadkanen" - Asha Bhosle
"Kisi Ke Ghar Mein To Ghee Ke Chirag" - Asha Bhosle
"Jisko Naa Lagi Ho Chot Kabhi" - Asha Bhosle
"Ummeeden Toot Gayi Apni, Tadapti Hai Tamannayen" - Asha Bhosle

References

External links
 

Films scored by Husnlal Bhagatram
Films scored by Sardar Malik
1951 films
1950s Hindi-language films
Indian black-and-white films